Chanmyathazi Township (also spelled Chanmyathasi Township;) is located in south-central area of Mandalay, Myanmar. Chanmyathazi is bounded by the Ayeyarwady river in the west, Maha Aungmye Township in the north, Pyigyidagun Township in the south. The Mahamuni Buddha, one of the city's main tourist attractions, is located in the township. It is home to University of Dental Medicine, Mandalay.

Notable places
 Chanmyathazi Airport
 Jivitadana Sangha Hospital
 Kandawgyi Gardens (Tatthay Lake)
 Mahamuni Buddha
 Mandalay Institute of Nursing

References

Townships of Mandalay
Townships of Mandalay Region
Mandalay